Jiangxia chaotoensis is a Chinese mesonychid from the Nongshanian division of the Upper Paleocene.  It may be related to the genera Dissacus and Hukoutherium.

Jinagxia chaotoensis was named after the province of Jiangxi, China, where it was found.

References

Mesonychids
Paleocene mammals
Prehistoric animals of China